Marie-Amable Foretier (1778-1854) was a Canadian philanthropist. She was a major supporter of the Association des Dames de la Charité, the first secular charity organization in Montreal, and was a leading figure in the new secular women's charitable movement in Canada.

References 

1778 births
1854 deaths
19th-century Canadian women
19th-century Canadian philanthropists
French Quebecers